The United States House of Representatives rarely meets in closed session.

Rules of the House
In the House, Rule XVII, clause 9, governs secret sessions, including the types of business to be considered behind closed doors. A motion to resolve into a secret session may only be made in the House, not in the Committee of the Whole. A Member who offers such a motion announces the possession of confidential information, and moves that the House go into a secret session. The motion is not debatable, but if agreed to, the Member making the motion is recognized under the one-hour rule in closed session.

Members and staff of both houses are prohibited from divulging information from
secret sessions, and all staff are sworn to secrecy. Violations of secrecy are punishable by the disciplinary rules of a chamber. A Member may be subject to a variety of punishments, including loss of seniority, fine, reprimand, censure, or expulsion. An officer or employee may be fired or subject to other internal disciplinary actions.

The proceedings of a secret session are not published unless the relevant chamber votes, during the meeting or at a later time, to release them. Then, those portions released are printed in the Congressional Record.

If the House decides not to release a transcript, it is ultimately transferred to the Clerk of the House of Representatives for transmittal to the archivist of the United States for preservation at the National Archives and Records Administration. The transcripts may be made available to the public after 30 years (Rule VII, clause 3).

List of closed sessions of the House since 1825
The House met frequently in secret session until the end of the War of 1812.  The House has met in closed session only 6 times since 1825.  The following is a full list of those sessions, along with their dates and the reasons they were called:

See also
Closed sessions of the United States Senate

References

Secret Sessions of Congress: A Brief Historical Overview
Amer, Mildred.  (Nov. 3, 2005). "Secret Sessions of the House and Senate" Congressional Research Service.  98-718 GOV.

 

United States government secrecy
United States House of Representatives